The Gilded Cage is a 1955 British crime film directed by John Gilling and starring Alex Nicol, Veronica Hurst and Clifford Evans. The film's title refers to a painting which features prominently in the story.

Plot
Two brothers become involved with criminals planning a major art heist, only to be framed by them for the theft.

The film is now available on DVD, having been released by Renown Pictures in 2013.

Cast
 Alex Nicol as Steve Anderson 
 Michael Alexander as Harry Anderson 
 Veronica Hurst as Marcia Farrell 
 Clifford Evans as Ken Aimes 
 Ursula Howells as Brenda Lucas 
 Trevor Reid as Inspector Brace 
 Elwyn Brook-Jones - Bruno 
 John Stuart as Harding
 Kenneth Cope as  Hotel Receptionist
 Ronan O'Casey as Trickson
 Hal Osmond

Critical reception
The Radio Times wrote, "director John Gilling tries to push this tale of art theft and murder along at a decent pace, but spotting who framed Nichol's brother is hardly taxing."; while 
Sky Movies noted a "standard British thick-ear thriller of the Fifties...Vigorous playing from a solid cast that includes Clifford Evans and Veronica Hurst sees the ingenuous story through."

References

External links

1955 films
British crime films
1955 crime films
Films directed by John Gilling
1950s English-language films
1950s British films
British black-and-white films